Alejandro 'Álex' Sánchez López (born 6 June 1989) is a Spanish footballer who plays for SD Ejea as a striker.

He came to fame in 2009, when he became the first player to appear in a professional game with just one hand whilst representing Real Zaragoza.

Club career
Born in Zaragoza, Aragon, Sánchez started his football career with local Colegio Jesús-María El Salvador, joining Real Zaragoza's youth system still in his teens. In 2008, he began playing as a senior in both the national and regional leagues, with its B and C teams.

On 8 November 2009, Sánchez made his professional debut for the club, playing 20 minutes in the 3–1 La Liga away loss against Valencia CF after having come on as a substitute for Ángel Lafita. He became the first player to appear in a professional game with only one hand, but continued to be mainly registered with the reserves, however.

Sánchez rejected the offer to continue playing with Zaragoza B in mid-June 2011, going on to resume his career in the Segunda División B with CD Teruel and CD Tudelano. On 2 July 2015, after scoring 15 goals the previous campaign, he signed a two-year deal with Segunda División side CA Osasuna.

In January 2018, after representing in quick succession Tudelano (two spells) and Osasuna's second team, the 28-year-old Sánchez moved abroad for the first time and joined Sydney Olympic FC in the Australian National Premier Leagues NSW.

References

External links

1989 births
Living people
Spanish footballers
Footballers from Zaragoza
Association football forwards
La Liga players
Segunda División players
Segunda División B players
Tercera División players
Segunda Federación players
Tercera Federación players
CD Universidad de Zaragoza players
Real Zaragoza B players
Real Zaragoza players
CD Teruel footballers
CD Tudelano footballers
CA Osasuna players
CA Osasuna B players
SD Ejea players
Sydney Olympic FC players
Spanish expatriate footballers
Expatriate soccer players in Australia
Spanish expatriate sportspeople in Australia
Spanish disabled sportspeople